Joner is a surname. Notable people with the surname include:

Alexandra Joner (born 1990), Norwegian singer and dancer, daughter of Sverre
Kristoffer Joner (born 1972), Norwegian actor
Sverre Indris Joner (born 1963), Norwegian musician, composer, and arranger

See also
Jonel